The 2020–21 UTEP Miners men's basketball team represented the University of Texas at El Paso during the 2020–21 NCAA Division I men's basketball season. The team was led by third-year head coach Rodney Terry, and played their home games at Don Haskins Center in El Paso, Texas as members of Conference USA.

Roster

Schedule and results

|-
!colspan=12 style=|Non-conference regular season

|-
!colspan=12 style=|CUSA regular season

|-
!colspan=12 style=| Conference USA tournament

|-

See also
 2020–21 UTEP Miners women's basketball team

Notes

References

UTEP Miners men's basketball seasons
UTEP Miners
UTEP men's basketball
UTEP men's basketball